Munyaradzi "Munya" Chidzonga (born December 8, 1983) is a Zimbabwean actor. He first rose to prominence in 2008, with his appearance on the reality TV show Big Brother Africa representing Zimbabwe in its third season, in which he achieved third place. In 2010, he participated in the fifth season of Big Brother Africa, becoming runners-up losing to Uti Nwachukwu, the representative for Nigeria, who also contested in Season 3.

After the reality show, Munya went on to produce and act in the films Lobola (2010) and The Gentleman (2011) through his production company, Ivory Pictures. In 2012, he won a NAMA Award for the Most Outstanding Actor in the Film and Television category for his performance in the film The Gentleman. In 2014, Chidzonga starred in the third season of the South African comedy-drama show Mzansi Love, which was aired on e.tv and eKasi+.

Early life and education
Chidzonga was born on 8 December 1985. For his secondary education, he attended Peterhouse Boys' School, an elite independent school just outside Marondera, where he was a prefect. He was hailed for his performance in a school play, "Absent Friends", in 2004. Munya was the first Petrean in the history of the school to receive a Drama award Colors for Drama.

Munya then went on to get a Bachelor of Arts degree in Motion Picture at The South African School of Motion Picture Medium and Live Performance in Cape Town, South Africa. Where he was nominated for best actor

Personal life
Chidzonga married 2008 Idols East Africa finalist Adiona Maboreke at a private ceremony in Harare in 2012. Chidzonga and Maboreke had been dating since 2009 and had a son named Pfumai, born in 2010, prior to the marriage. The couple had a second son, named Diwai, born in 2015.

Filmography

Films

Television

References

External links
 
Munya Chidzonga at Television South Africa
 

Living people
Zimbabwean male film actors
Zimbabwean filmmakers
Zimbabwean businesspeople
Alumni of Peterhouse Boys' School
Zimbabwean male television actors
21st-century Zimbabwean male actors
Actors from Harare
1986 births